Monagroulli (diminutive of Monagri) is a village in the Limassol District of Cyprus, located 3 km northeast og Moni and 6 km southwest of Asgata.

References

Communities in Limassol District